London House was the London mansion of the Bishop of London after the restoration of the monarchy in 1660. Today the site, 172 Aldersgate Street is occupied by a block of flats.

History
About the middle of the west side of Aldersgate street, stood a palace, that was the residence first of the Henry Pierrepont, 1st Marquess of Dorchester, and then of William, Lord Petre. It was here in 1646 that Michael Hudson was imprisoned while being questioned by a Parliamentary committee about the flight of Charles I from Oxford to Newark-upon-Trent.

The house was purchased from Lord Petre after the restoration to be the London City mansion of the Bishop of London. From that time it was known by the name of London House. After the bishops ceased to use it as a residence, it was at last let out into tenements and warehouses. In 1750–1751 the City of London Lying-in Hospital for married women and sick and lame Outpatients was located in London House before moving to Thanet or Shaftesbury House also in Aldersgate Street. In the late 1760s the structure was consumed by fire, and private buildings were erected in its place.

Notes

References
 
 

History of the City of London